The 2017 Judo Grand Prix The Hague was held at the Sportcampus Zuiderpark in The Hague, Netherlands, from 17 to 19 November 2017.

Medal summary

Men's events

Women's events

Source Results

Medal table

References

External links
 

2017 IJF World Tour
2017 Judo Grand Prix
Judo
Judo competitions in the Netherlands
Judo
Judo